Hot Mess is the third studio album by the American musical ensemble Cobra Starship, released through Fueled by Ramen and Decaydance Records on August 11, 2009. The album is the follow-up to 2007's ¡Viva la Cobra!. It debuted at #4 on the Billboard 200 albums chart on sales of more than 42,000, by far their best chart performance ever.

The first single from the album, "Good Girls Go Bad", features actress Leighton Meester and was released on May 11, 2009. The song peaked in the top ten of the Billboard Hot 100 and at number two on the New Zealand Singles Chart.

Reception
An advance review by James Montgomery of MTV stated this was their most brilliant album. Michael Menachem of Billboard fell in favor of the album, saying "If you don't finish this party record a hot mess, then you probably didn't have a good time." Tim Sendra of AllMusic called Hot Mess "a complete success and shows that the band could possibly grow past the comedy and become something else entirely." Daniel Brockman of The Phoenix gave a generally positive review, stating, "Only a music fan obsessed with the rules of authenticity and the requirements for lyrical profundity could find fault with the 11 odes to overload that make up Hot Mess." Mikael Wood of Spin raved that "Hot Mess is flush with other stupid-smart highlights, including 'Pete Wentz Is the Only Reason We're Famous." Rolling Stone'''s Christian Hoard said that "Sometimes the former Midtown singer's snark falls flat, as with the title 'Pete Wentz Is the Only Reason We're Famous' or the part where the singer brags about his ass. But Saporta does have some pop gifts, apparent on the disco 'Living in the Sky with Diamonds.'" Edna Gundersen of USA Today gave the album three stars out of four and stated: "While unquestionably accessible, Cobra's retro, overly flashy Swedish-leaning pop isn't for everyone. It's daft, it's dorky, it's discofied, but it's also deliciously fun and kitschy."

Bill Lamb of About.com gave the album 4/5 stars, using a comparison to praise; "You went digging around in your parents closet of old vinyl LP's from the 80's, found one with candy-coated colors on the cover, played it on their old turntable and discovered it really wasn't bad. Then a few days later after listening to it for the 15th time you realized you had fallen in love with the goofy, fun, sarcastic music. It's quite possible it sounded a lot like Cobra Starship's Hot Mess."

By October 2009, the album's sales stood at 80,000.

Track listing

Charts

Certifications and sales

Personnel
Cobra Starship
Gabe Saporta – lead vocals
Ryland Blackinton – guitar, backing vocals and synthesizer
Alex Suarez – bass and backing vocals
Nate Navarro – drums
Victoria Asher – keytar and backing vocals
All songs written and performed by Cobra Starship

Produced by Cobra Starship except:
Track 3 produced by Kevin Rudolf.
Tracks 6 and 7 produced by Mike Caren and Oligee and co-produced by Kevin Rudolf.
Tracks 10 and 11 co-produced by Jayson DeZuzio.

Additional musicians
The Goodie Two Shoes Gang: Lori Hernberg, Cody Tompkins, Bim Fernandez, Janice Cruz, Christine J. Schmidt, Emily Everding and Jaime Boulter – "Nice Guys Finish Last"
Leighton Meester – "Good Girls Go Bad"
Patrick Stump, Cassadee Pope, The Fuck City Singers: Pete Wentz, Matt Bro and Dre – "You're Not in on the Joke"
Christine J. Schmidt – "Move Like You Gonna Die"
B.o.B – "The World Will Never Do"

Album artwork
Art direction and design: Mike Yardley / Skull with Hair
Photos: Matthew Salacuse
Live photo: Jack Edinger
Cover girl: Bim Fernandez
Tattoo by: James Kelly for Red Rocket Tattoo NYC
Art manager: Kristie Borgmann
Packaging manager: Michelle Piza
Inspiration for title Hot Mess'' – L.O. 43.

References
 Citations

Sources

External links

2009 albums
Cobra Starship albums
Fueled by Ramen albums